The 2018–19 Women's Basketball League of Serbia is the 13th season of the Women's Basketball League of Serbia, the highest professional basketball league in Serbia. Also, it's the 75th national championship played by Serbian clubs inclusive of nation's previous incarnations as Yugoslavia and Serbia & Montenegro.

The first half of the season consists of 12 teams and 132-game regular season (22 games for each of the 12 teams).

Teams

Promotion and relegation 
Teams promoted from the Second League
Loznica
Novosadska ŽKA
Teams relegated to the Second League
Šumadija
Vršac

Venues and locations

Regular season

Standings

Playoffs

Bracket

Semifinals 

|}

Finals 
Crvena zvezda won 3–0 over 021 in the Finals.

|}

See also
 2018–19 Milan Ciga Vasojević Cup
 2018–19 Basketball League of Serbia
 2018–19 WABA League

References

External links
 Official website
 League Standings at eurobasket.com
 League Standings at srbijasport.net

First Women's Basketball League of Serbia seasons
Serbia
Basketball